Trenchia wolffi is a species of sea snail, a marine gastropod mollusk, unassigned in the superfamily Seguenzioidea, the turban snails.

Distribution
This marine species occurs off New Zealand.

References

External links
 To Encyclopedia of Life
 To World Register of Marine Species
 Knudsen J. 1964. Scaphopoda and Gastropoda from depths exceeding 6000 meters. Galathea Report 7: 125-136.

wolffi
Gastropods described in 1964